Tartarian may be the adjective form of:

 Tartarus, a place in the underworld of Greek mythology
 Tartary, a historic name for much of Central and Northern Asia
 Tatars, several Turkic groups
 Tatar languages (disambiguation), several Turkic languages with the name

See also 
 Black Tartarian, a cherry cultivar
 Tartaric acid
 Tartar (disambiguation)
 Tatar (disambiguation)
 Tartarus (disambiguation)
 Aura Soltana, also known as Ipolitan the Tartarian, a Russia woman at the English court in the 1560s